Here Comes Happiness is a 1941 American comedy film directed by Noel M. Smith and written by Charles L. Tedford. The film stars Mildred Coles, Edward Norris, Richard Ainley, Russell Hicks, Marjorie Gateson and John Ridgely. The film was released by Warner Bros. on March 15, 1941.

Plot
A rich heiress Jessica (Mildred Coles), tired of being romantically pursued for her money, abandons her wealthy environment to find a suitable partner as a working class girl. In her new blue collar lifestyle, she falls in love with Chet (Edward Norris), an ambitious sandblaster attempting to rise up from his working class circumstances.

A series of misunderstandings ensue as Chet begins to suspect Jessica is not the innocent waif she appears to be, mistaking her secret meetings with her father (Russell Hicks) as a romantic relationship with a rich older man. Complications ensue until the misunderstandings eventually clear up, allowing them to reveal their genuine love for each other.

Cast  
Mildred Coles as Jessica Vance
Edward Norris as Chet Madden
Richard Ainley as Jelliffe Blaine
Russell Hicks as John Vance
Marjorie Gateson as Emily Vance
John Ridgely as Jim
Eddie Acuff as Bill
Lucia Carroll as Peg
Helen Lynd as Flo
Marie Blake as Clara
Edward Gargan as Joe
Vera Lewis as Mrs. James
Joseph Crehan as Tom Burke
Ann Edmonds as Miss Barnes
William Hopper as Best Man

References

External links 
 

1941 films
Warner Bros. films
American comedy films
1941 comedy films
Films directed by Noel M. Smith
American black-and-white films
1940s English-language films
1940s American films